Dave Molyneux (born 21 November 1963 in Douglas, Isle of Man) is a Manx professional Sidecar racer. He is the most successful Sidecar competitor in the history of the Isle of Man TT races, achieving 17 TT victories and 30 podium finishes. His race wins place him fourth on the all-time wins list, behind solo bike racers Joey Dunlop (26 wins), John McGuinness (23) and Michael Dunlop.

Moly, as he is often known, was the sidecar lap record holder for the Snaefell mountain course set in 2015 with a time of 19 minutes 23.056 seconds, an average race speed of 116.785 mph for 1 lap.

In 2013, a right-hand bend on the Snaefell Mountain Course used for TT and Manx Grand Prix races at the end of Cronk-y-Voddy Straight on the main A3 road was named Molyneux's in recognition of his wins, together with John McGuinness who was similarly honoured.

Raceology

Beginning his TT career at the 1985 races, Molyneux failed to record a finish  until his fifth outing in the first race at the 1987 'A' race where he placed tenth, but failed to finish in his sixth event, the 'B' race (the event is raced over two legs with the overall winner performing the best in terms of aggregate). Improvement continued 1988 with a sixth-place finish in the first leg of the Sidecar TT before retirement in the second race.

The 1989 meeting saw Molyneux begin to dominate the event with his maiden TT victory. Campaigning a Bregazzi Yamaha and partnered by experienced passenger Colin Hardman, the team took first place in the 'A' and third in the 'B' race. This resulted in Molyneux and Hardman claiming overall victory for the 1989 Sidecar TT.

Dave Molyneux and Craig Hallam crashed during Thursday afternoon practice session for the 2006 races at Rhencullen after the sidecar outfit experienced a 140 mph Donald Campbell "bluebird-style flip." The outfit was destroyed in the resulting fire and Molyneux was unable to compete in the actual races due to injury. He made a comeback the following year taking a double victory, bringing his tally of wins to 13 at that time.

His 14th victory came in 2009, when he also became the first winner of a TT sidecar race on a Suzuki powered machine. The lone race of 2009 saw him set a new race record on his Suzuki, (see above).

Moly did not compete at the TT in 2011 (although he rode the ex-Biland / O'Dell Seymaz Yamaha in the classic parade, with former TT passenger Karl Ellison), but he returned to the TT in 2012 on a Kawasaki powered machine winning both races. The first 2012 Sidecar race also made Molyneux the first ever competitor to win TTs using all four of the major Japanese manufacturers engines (Yamaha, Honda, Suzuki & Kawasaki).

2014 saw him take his 17th TT win in the second sidecar race. He led the first race by more than 20 seconds until an engine misfire caused him to stop on the final lap.

He is also a builder of road racing sidecars under the name DMR, Dave Molyneux Racing, and has supplied sidecars to many other TT winners including 10-time winner Rob Fisher, 2006 double winner Nick Crowe and 6x FIM World Champion Tim Reeves.

Filmography

In 2017, Molyneux received top billing for his role in the film 3 Wheeling, an observational documentary filmed during TT period of 2016. The film premiered on 7 May 2017, followed by a limited theatrical release of 150 commercial screenings in cinemas in Northern Ireland, Germany, and the Isle of Man. Molyneux has not watched the film because he considers his racing efforts during the filming period to be "an absolute disaster", but praised the filmmakers for their hard work and ambitious promotion of Sidecar racing.

In 1994, Molyneux choreographed and performed the motorcycle stuntwork for Matthew Barney's film Cremaster 4, the first film in the acclaimed Cremaster series.

Racing Statistics

TT Race Victories

TT career summary

Sources

External links
 TT database rider profile iomtt.com
 TT database TT results iomtt.com
 Dave Molyneux film profile at the IMDb

1963 births
Living people
Manx motorcycle racers
Isle of Man TT riders
Sidecar racers